Thysanotus manglesianus is a herb in the Asparagaceae family, endemic to Western Australia, which was first described in 1843 by Carl Sigismund Kunth, from a specimen collected by James Mangles on the Swan River.

References 

Asparagales of Australia
Flora of Western Australia
Lomandroideae